Elections for Ealing Council in London were held on 6 May 2010.  The 2010 United Kingdom General Election and other local elections took place on the same day.

In London council elections the entire council is elected every four years, as opposed to some local elections where one councillor is elected every year in three of the four years.

The Labour Party gained control of the borough from the Conservatives, who themselves had taken control from Labour at the previous elections in 2006.

Summary of results

Wards and Results

Detailed Results

Acton Central

Cleveland

Dormers Wells

Ealing Broadway

Ealing Common

East Acton

Elthorne

Greenford Broadway

Greenford Green

Hanger Hill

Hobbayne

Lady Margaret

North Greenford

Northfield

Northolt Mandeville

Northolt West End

Norwood Green

Perivale

South Acton

Southall Broadway

Southall Green

Southfield

Walpole

References

2010
2010 London Borough council elections
May 2010 events in the United Kingdom